Kalervo Alanenpää (born 18 April 1956) is a Swedish boxer. He competed in the men's lightweight event at the 1980 Summer Olympics. Born in Ylitornio, Finland, Alanenpää moved to Sweden in 1977. He was a Finnish citizen until a month before he competed at the Olympics.

References

1956 births
Living people
Swedish male boxers
Olympic boxers of Sweden
Boxers at the 1980 Summer Olympics
People from Ylitornio
Lightweight boxers
Finnish emigrants to Sweden
Naturalized citizens of Sweden
Swedish people of Finnish descent